Shakti Mohan is an Indian dancer, choreographer and television personality. She is the winner of Zee TV's dance reality show  Dance India Dance 2. She is a judge and captain of Indian Reality shows like Dance plus seasons

Career
Following her victory in the second season of Dance India Dance, Shakti produced dance-themed calendars for 2012 and 2013. She also appeared in the fictional dance based teen series Dil Dosti Dance as main lead character. She was also a contestant and finalist on Jhalak Dikhhla Jaa in 2014. Her first song as a choreographer in Bollywood is "Nainowale Ne" in the movie Padmaavat. She owns her own dance brand called Nritya Shakti. She was also the judge and mentor in the dance competition reality show called Dance Plus for Seasons 1–4. She is the younger sister of the singer Neeti Mohan and elder sister of the dancer and actress Mukti Mohan. In 2012, she collaborated with the composer Mohammed Fairouz on a BBC-sponsored dance project in New York. She also produced a dance music video with her sisters. In 2013, Mohan launched a YouTube channel with dance instruction videos. In 2015, Shakti also judged the show Dance Singapore Dance. Shakti has also been a part of a L’Oréal Paris campaign in 2020.

In 2020, Shakti has choreographed a song for Ranbir Kapoor in upcoming film Shamshera directed by Karan Malhotra. The film is set to release in July 2022.

She appeared in the music videos Akh Lad Jaave Nritya Jam (2018), Kanha Re (2018), Aakhri Baar (2019), ‘The Chamiya Song’ (2019) and ‘Saaton Janam’ (2020), Kamli (2013)

Shakti Mohan, with her brand NrityaShakti, has produced two web shows on YouTube named “Break A Leg” Season 1 and 2.

Filmography

Films

Television

Music videos

See also
 List of dancers

References

External links

 

Indian female dancers
Living people
Dancers from Delhi
Reality dancing competition winners
Indian contemporary dancers
Women artists from Delhi
1985 births